"My Baby You" is a song written and performed by Marc Anthony, and was released as the fourth single of his first English-language album Marc Anthony.

Song information
The song was written and produced by Marc Anthony and Walter Afanasieff, and was the first single from the album Marc Anthony without a Spanish version and was dedicated to his daughter, Arianna. The single was less successful than the previous singles from the performer, peaking low at number 70 in the Billboard Hot 100 chart. Because no physical single was released, the track was charting airplay only.

Daniel Evans, a finalist on season 5 of The X Factor also released a version on his debut album, No Easy Way, also dedicating it to his daughter, Ana, whose mother died shortly after giving birth.

Chart performance
The single entered the Billboard Hot 100 chart at number 82 in the week of September 16, 2000, climbing to its peak position (number 70) in the week of October 7, 2000.

Charts

Weekly charts

Year-end charts

References

2000 singles
Marc Anthony songs
Songs written by Marc Anthony
Songs written by Walter Afanasieff
Song recordings produced by Walter Afanasieff
1999 songs
Columbia Records singles